Brian Nielsen (born 1 April 1965) is a Danish former professional boxer. He held the IBO heavyweight title from 1996 to 1999 successfully defending it five times, including against Larry Holmes and Phil Jackson, the second highest number of defenses behind Wladimir Klitschko's record of 18. At one point of time, he equaled Rocky Marciano's record of 49 successive wins with no losses. While he never held a world title from any of the main four sanctioning bodies (WBC, IBF, WBA, WBO), he did defeat several former world champions who had, including Orlin Norris, Carlos De León, Jeff Lampkin, and Tony Tubbs.

Amateur career
As an amateur, Nielsen won bronze medals in the super heavyweight division at the 1991 European Championships and the 1992 Olympics in Barcelona.

Brian Nielsen was sent to Svendborg, where Johnny Antonsen had arranged a match against the local hero Carsten Dahl. Nielsen easily beat Dahl, winning the bout by knockout in the second round. Dahl later got the opportunity for revenge, but again Nielsen won by knockout.

He was both Zealand champion and Danish champion for five consecutive years (1988-1992), and also won numerous international tournaments. His career as an amateur ended after the Olympics in Barcelona in 1992 where he won the bronze. In the semifinals he lost to the powerful Cuban Roberto Balado. Balado won 15 to 1.

In total, Nielsen boxed 111 fights as an amateur and won 104. He only took a count once in amateur career, and only once was he stopped before time - during the 1989 European Championship bout, where he suffered a cut near one of his eyes. His opponent at this match was the Greek boxer George Tsachakis who attended the final.

Professional career
After his  win over 41-year-old ex-World Boxing Association champion James 'Bonecrusher' Smith in October 1994, Nielsen began to attract attention. He went on to hold the minor IBO belt during an unbeaten streak equaling that of legend Rocky Marciano. He later held the minor IBC belt.

Tyson fight
On 13 October 2001, Nielsen fought Mike Tyson at the Parken Stadium in Copenhagen. After six rounds heavily in Tyson's favour, Nielsen quit on his stool citing an eye injury. Nielsen was knocked down once in the third round.

Announced comeback and Holyfield fight
On February 8, 2010, Brian Nielsen told reporters that he was prepared to return to the ring, after 8 years of absence, and that a proposed fight against Evander Holyfield had been met with interest by both sides. Though originally thought unrealistic by former promoter Mogens Palle, due to Nielsen's bad knee, Nielsen's comeback was confirmed by Nielsen's promoter Sauerland Event on June 1, 2010.

Nielsen met Holyfield on May 7, 2011 in a World Boxing Federation (WBF) title bout, in Copenhagen. Holyfield won the fight, knocking Nielsen down in the 3rd with a left hook and stopping him by TKO in the 10th.

Controversy

At a press conference prior to the Mike Tyson fight, Nielsen called Tyson an "abekat" which was translated as "monkey". The Tyson camp took great offense at this supposed racial slur, and Tyson himself declared, "This will make me punish him even more than I had planned." The controversy over the remark calmed down when the expression was clarified to the media by Danish linguists as having no racial connotations and simply meaning "brat" in Danish.

Controversy arose in early 2004, when journeyman heavyweight Thomas Williams stated that he had been bribed to throw his fight against Nielsen in March, 2000. Along with promoter Robert Mitchell, Williams was indicted by the United States District Court for the District of Nevada for match fixing in order to promote the career of Richie Melito, and it was during the FBI's investigation of that case that Williams admitted to intentionally losing to Nielsen. The fix was arranged by promoter Robert Mittleman, a frequent associate of Nielsen's promoter Mogens Palle, who later confessed that he had been paid $1,000, while Williams had received "up to $40,000" from Palle in order to lose the fight. Williams, Mitchell and Mittleman were all found guilty of sports bribery by the court in November and December, 2004.

The Nielsen vs. Williams fight was the 57th of Nielsen's career. Nielsen and Mogens Palle denied any knowledge of the match fixing, and were not charged of any wrongdoing by American or Danish authorities.

Professional boxing record

{|class="wikitable" style="text-align:center; font-size:95%"
|-
!Result
!Record
!Opponent
!Type
!Round, time
!Date
!Location
!Notes
|-align=center
| Loss
| 64–3
| Evander Holyfield
| TKO
| 10 
| 
| Align=left| 
| Align=left|
|- style="text-align:center;"
| Win
| 64–2
| Uriah Grant
| UD
| 8
| 
| Align=left| 
|
|- style="text-align:center;"
| Win
| 63–2
| Ken Murphy
| UD
| 8
| 
| Align=left| 
|
|- style="text-align:center;"
| Loss
| 62–2
| Mike Tyson
| RTD
| 6 
| 
| Align=left| 
| Align=left|
|- style="text-align:center;"
| Win
| 62–1
| Orlin Norris
| UD
| 12
| 
| Align=left| 
| Align=left|
|- style="text-align:center;"
| Win
| 61–1
| Benji Baker
| TKO
| 6 
| 
| Align=left| 
| Align=left|
|- style="text-align:center;"
| Win
| 60–1
| Dicky Ryan
| UD
| 8
| 
| Align=left| 
| Align=left|
|- style="text-align:center;"
| Win
| 59–1
| Andy Sample
| TKO
| 2 
| 
| Align=left| 
| Align=left|
|- style="text-align:center;"
| Win
| 58–1
| Kevin Cook
| KO
| 1 
| 
| Align=left| 
| Align=left|
|- style="text-align:center;"
| Win
| 57–1
| Jeremy Williams
| TKO
| 5 
| 
| Align=left| 
| Align=left|
|- style="text-align:center;"
| Win
| 56–1
| Thomas Williams
| KO
| 3 
| 
| Align=left| 
| Align=left|
|- style="text-align:center;"
| Win
| 55–1
| Jeff Pegues
| KO
| 3 
| 
| Align=left| 
| Align=left|
|- style="text-align:center;"
| Win
| 54–1
| Troy Weida
| KO
| 8 
| 
| Align=left| 
| Align=left|
|- style="text-align:center;"
| Win
| 53–1
| Frank Wood
| KO
| 2 
| 
| Align=left| 
|
|- style="text-align:center;"
| Win
| 52–1
| Don Normand
| KO
| 1 
| 
| Align=left| 
|
|- style="text-align:center;"
| Win
| 51–1
| Dale Crowe
| UD
| 8
| 
| Align=left| 
|
|- style="text-align:center;"
| Win
| 50–1
| Shane Sutcliffe
| KO
| 5 
|
| Align=left| 
|
|- style="text-align:center;"
| Loss
| 49–1
| Dicky Ryan
| TKO
| 10 
| 
| Align=left| 
| Align=left|
|- style="text-align:center;"
| Win
| 49–0
| Tim Witherspoon
| TKO
| 4 
| 
| Align=left| 
| Align=left|
|- style="text-align:center;"
| Win
| 48–0
| Paul Phillips
| KO
| 2 
| 
| Align=left| 
| Align=left|
|- style="text-align:center;"
| Win
| 47–0
| Peter McNeeley
| KO
| 3 
| 
| Align=left| 
| Align=left|
|- style="text-align:center;"
| Win
| 46–0
| Dan Murphy
| TKO
| 2 
| 
| Align=left| 
| Align=left|
|- style="text-align:center;"
| Win
| 45–0
| Lionel Butler
| KO
| 1 
| 
| Align=left| 
| Align=left|
|- style="text-align:center;"
| Win
| 44–0
| Garing Lane
| KO
| 2 
| 
| Align=left| 
| Align=left|
|- style="text-align:center;"
| Win
| 43–0
| Terry Ray
| TKO
| 5 
| 
| Align=left| 
| Align=left|
|- style="text-align:center;"
| Win
| 42–0
| George Linberger
| TKO
| 2 
| 
| Align=left| 
| Align=left|
|- style="text-align:center;"
| Win
| 41–0
| Joey Guy
| UD
| 8
| 
| Align=left| 
| Align=left|
|- style="text-align:center;"
| Win
| 40–0
| Donnell Wingfield
| KO
| 1 
| 
| Align=left| 
| Align=left|
|- style="text-align:center;"
| Win
| 39–0
| Don Steele
| KO
| 2 
| 
| Align=left| 
| Align=left|
|- style="text-align:center;"
| Win
| 38–0
| Crawford Grimsley
| TKO
| 6 
| 
| Align=left| 
| Align=left|
|- style="text-align:center;"
| Win
| 37–0
| Bruce Douglas
| KO
| 1 
| 
| Align=left| 
| Align=left|
|- style="text-align:center;"
| Win
| 36–0
| Marcos Gonzales
| TKO
| 4 
| 
| Align=left| 
| Align=left|
|- style="text-align:center;"
| Win
| 35–0
| James Pritchard
| KO
| 3 
| 
| Align=left| 
| Align=left|
|- style="text-align:center;"
| Win
| 34–0
| Damon Reed
| UD
| 8
| 
| Align=left| 
| Align=left|
|- style="text-align:center;"
| Win
| 33–0
| Pedro Daniel Franco
| UD
| 8
| 
| Align=left| 
| Align=left|
|- style="text-align:center;"
| Win
| 32–0
| Larry Holmes
| SD
| 12
| 
| Align=left| 
| Align=left|
|- style="text-align:center;"
| Win
| 31–0
| Marcus Rhode
| TKO
| 2 
| 
| Align=left| 
| Align=left|
|- style="text-align:center;"
| Win
| 30–0
| Andrew Maynard
| TKO
| 6 
| 
| Align=left| 
| Align=left|
|- style="text-align:center;"
| Win
| 29–0
| Jerry Halstead
| KO
| 2 
| 
| Align=left| 
| Align=left|
|- style="text-align:center;"
| Win
| 28–0
| Mike Hunter
| TKO
| 5 
| 
| Align=left| 
| Align=left|
|- style="text-align:center;"
| Win
| 27–0
| Salvador Maciel
| TKO
| 3 
| 
| Align=left| 
| Align=left|
|- style="text-align:center;"
| Win
| 26–0
| Phil Jackson
| TKO
| 6 
| 
| Align=left| 
| Align=left|
|- style="text-align:center;"
| Win
| 25–0
| Jeff Lally
| TKO
| 2 
| 
| Align=left| 
| Align=left|
|- style="text-align:center;"
| Win
| 24–0
| Tony LaRosa
| TKO
| 2 
| 
| Align=left| 
| Align=left|
|- style="text-align:center;"
| Win
| 23–0
| Carlos De Leon
| TKO
| 3 
| 
| Align=left| 
|
|- style="text-align:center;"
| Win
| 22–0
| Tony Tubbs
| TKO
| 4 
| 
| Align=left| 
|
|- style="text-align:center;"
| Win
| 21–0
| Terry Davis
| UD
| 8
| 
| Align=left| 
|
|- style="text-align:center;"
| Win
| 20–0
| Jim Huffman
| DQ
| 6 
| 
| Align=left| 
|
|- style="text-align:center;"
| Win
| 19–0
| Jason Waller
| TKO
| 2 
| 
| Align=left| 
|
|- style="text-align:center;"
| Win
| 18–0
|Tim Noble
| UD
| 8
| 
| Align=left| 
|
|- style="text-align:center;"
| Win
| 17–0
| Doug Davis
| TKO
| 6 
| 
| Align=left| 
|
|- style="text-align:center;"
| Win
| 16–0
| Matt Green
| KO
| 1 
| 
| Align=left| 
|
|- style="text-align:center;"
| Win
| 15–0
| Jeff Lampkin
| UD
| 8
| 
| Align=left| 
|
|- style="text-align:center;"
| Win
| 14–0
| Terry Anderson
| KO
| 5 
| 
| Align=left| 
|
|- style="text-align:center;"
| Win
| 13–0
| James Smith
| TKO
| 5 
| 
| Align=left| 
|
|- style="text-align:center;"
| Win
| 12–0
| George Stephens
| KO
| 1 
| 
| Align=left| 
|
|- style="text-align:center;"
| Win
| 11–0
| Ken Merritt
| KO
| 8 
| 
| Align=left| 
|
|- style="text-align:center;"
| Win
| 10–0
| Ron Gullette
| KO
| 3 
| 
| Align=left| 
|
|- style="text-align:center;"
| Win
| 9–0
| Ross Puritty
| UD
| 4
| 
| Align=left| 
|
|- style="text-align:center;"
| Win
| 8–0
| Mike Acey
| KO
| 2 
| 
| Align=left| 
|
|- style="text-align:center;"
| Win
| 7–0
| Mike Dixon
| UD
| 8
| 
| Align=left| 
|
|- style="text-align:center;"
| Win
| 6–0
| Jean Chanet
| UD
| 6
| 
| Align=left| 
|
|- style="text-align:center;"
| Win
| 5–0
| Roger McKenzie
| UD
| 6
| 
| Align=left| 
|
|- style="text-align:center;"
| Win
| 4–0
| Jean Weiss
| UD
| 6
| 
| Align=left| 
|
|- style="text-align:center;"
| Win
| 3–0
| Carl Gaffney
| UD
| 6
| 
| Align=left| 
|
|- style="text-align:center;"
| Win
| 2–0
| Steve Gee
| UD
| 6
| 
| Align=left| 
|
|- style="text-align:center;"
| Win
| 1–0
| Terry Armstrong
| UD
| 6
| 
| Align=left| 
| Align=left|

References

External links
 

|-

1965 births
Boxers at the 1992 Summer Olympics
Heavyweight boxers
Living people
Olympic boxers of Denmark
Olympic bronze medalists for Denmark
Olympic medalists in boxing
People from Korsør
Danish male boxers
Medalists at the 1992 Summer Olympics
Sportspeople from Region Zealand